Jarylo, alternatively Yaryla, Iarilo, Juraj, Jurij, or Gerovit, is a East and South Slavic god of vegetation, fertility and springtime.

Etymology
The Proto-Slavic root *jarъ (jar), from Proto-Indo-European *yōr-, *yeh₁ro-, from *yeh₁r-, means "spring" or "summer", "strong", "furious", "imbued with youthful life-force". This youthful life-force was considered sacred in the Slavic pre-Christian religion and the god personifying this sacred force was thus called Jarovit, or hypocoristically Jarilo.

Sources
The only historic source that mentions this deity is a 12th-century biography of the proselytizing German bishop Otto of Bamberg, who, during his expeditions to convert the pagan tribes of Wendish and Polabian Slavs, encountered festivals in honor of the war-god Gerovit in the cities of Wolgast and Havelberg. Gerovit is most likely a German derivation of the Slavic name Jarovit.

Up until the 19th century in Russia, Belarus and Serbia, folk festivals called Jarilo were celebrated in late spring or early summer. Early researchers of Slavic mythology  recognised in them relics of pagan ceremonies in honor of an eponymous spring deity. 
In northern Croatia and southern Slovenia, especially White Carniola, similar spring festivals were called Jurjevo or Zeleni Juraj or Zeleni Jurij (Green George), nominally dedicated to St. George, and fairly similar to the Jarilo festivals of other Slavic nations.

All of these spring festivals were basically alike: processions of villagers would go around for a walk in the country or through villages on this day. Something or someone was identified to be Jarilo or Juraj: a doll made of straw, a man or a child adorned with green branches, or a girl dressed like a man, riding on a horse. Certain songs were sung which alluded to Juraj/Jarilo's return from a distant land across the sea, the return of spring into the world, blessings, fertility and abundance to come.

Myth

Radoslav Katičić and Vitomir Belaj attempted to reconstruct the mythology surrounding Jarilo.
According to these authors, he was a fairly typical life-death-rebirth deity, believed to be (re)born and killed every year. His mythical life cycle mirrored that of the wheat crop, from its birth when sown through its flourishing youth to its sacrificial death at harvest time.

Jarilo was a son of the supreme Slavic god of thunder, Perun, his lost, missing, tenth son, born on the last night of February, the festival of Velja Noć (Great Night), the pagan Slavic celebration of the New Year. On the same night, however, Jarilo was stolen from his father and taken to the world of the dead, where he was adopted and raised by Veles, Perun's enemy, Slavic god of the underworld and cattle. The Slavs believed the underworld to be an ever-green world of eternal spring and wet, grassy plains, where Jarilo grew up guarding the cattle of his adoptive father. In the mythical geography of ancient Slavs, the land of the dead was assumed to lie across the sea, where migrating birds would fly every winter.

With the advent of spring, Jarilo returned from the underworld, that is, bringing spring and fertility to the land. Spring festivals of Jurjevo/Jarilo that survived in later folklore celebrated his return. Katičić identified a key phrase of ancient mythical texts which described this sacred return of vegetation and fertility as a rhyme hoditi/roditi  (to walk/to give birth to), which survived in folk songs:
...Gdje Jura/Jare/Jarilo hodit, tam vam polje rodit...
"...Where Jura/Jare/Jarilo walks, there your field gives birth..."

The first of the gods to notice Jarilo's return to the living world was Morana, a goddess of death and nature, and also a daughter of Perun and Jarilo's twin-sister. The two of them would fall in love and court each other through a series of traditional, established rituals, imitated in various Slavic courting or wedding customs. The divine wedding between brother and sister, two children of the supreme god, was celebrated in a festival of summer solstice, today variously known as Ivanje or Ivan Kupala in the various Slavic countries. This sacred union of Jarilo and Morana, deities of vegetation and of nature, assured abundance, fertility and blessing to the earth, and also brought temporary peace between two major Slavic gods, Perun and Veles, signifying heaven and underworld. Thus, all mythical prerequisites were met for a bountiful and blessed harvest that would come in late summer.

However, since Jarilo's life was ultimately tied to the vegetative cycle of the cereals, after the harvest (which was ritually seen as a murder of crops), Jarilo also met his death. The myth explained this by the fact that he was unfaithful to his wife, and so she (or their father Perun, or their brothers) kills him in retribution. This rather gruesome death is in fact a ritual sacrifice, and Morana uses parts of Jarilo's body to build herself a new house. This is a mythical metaphor which alludes to rejuvenation of the entire cosmos, a concept fairly similar to that of Scandinavian myth of Ymir, a giant from whose body the gods created the world.

Without her husband, however, Morana turns into a frustrated old hag, a terrible and dangerous goddess of death, frost and upcoming winter (like the Celtic Cailleach), and eventually dies by the end of the year. At the beginning of the next year, both she and Jarilo are born again, and the entire myth starts anew.

Description
As befitting an agricultural deity, Yarilo was associated with agricultural imagery, with grains and cereals: he wore a white cloak and a wheat wreath or a crown of flowers (wildflowers) on his head and carried a wheat sheaf in his right hand. He was also portrayed holding a human skull (or severed head) in his other hand. He is also said to be revered as "god of erotic sexuality".

Scholars Katičić and Belaj also suggested that the god had some equine characteristics, or, alternatively, was conceived of as a horse.

Folk accounts strongly emphasize the presence of a horse (in Belarusian festivals, for instance, Jarilo was symbolized by a girl dressed as a man and mounted on a horse), and also the fact Jarilo walked a long way and his feet are sore. Thus, he is a rider on a horse who also "walks".
In historic descriptions of West Slavic paganism, one often finds references to sacred horses held in temples, which were used for divination, and predictions were made on the basis of how the horse walked through rows of spears sticking from the ground.
In certain customs of some Baltic and Slavic wedding celebrations, a horse symbolizes a young husband.
In some Slavic folk songs, an angry young wife, apparently cheated upon by her husband, kills a horse or orders her brothers to kill it for her.
Jarilo's identification as a mischievous god may involve the ability of shapeshifting. This is seen in other mischievous pagan deities, such as Proteus and Loki, who himself once took the form of a horse.

Comparison with other deities
From comparison to Baltic mythology and from Slavic folklore accounts, one can deduce that Jarilo was associated with the Moon. His somewhat mischievous nature, which ultimately results in his betrayal of his wife, was likened to the Moon's changing phases.

He has also been compared to other death and rebirth gods associated with agricultural fertility, like Greek Adonis and Olympian god Dionysus.

Identification with St. George
With the advent of Christianity, Jarilo became identified with St. George and St. John, because the festivals of these two saints fell within the period between first growth and harvest time in the great annual cycle of vegetation and fertility. This made them especially suited to assuming the functions of this god under the new, Christian dispensation.

See also
Tetri Giorgi
2273 Yarilo
Yaroslav (disambiguation)
Yarovit

References

Bibliography 
 V. Belaj. "Hod kroz godinu: mitska pozadina hrvatskih narodnih običaja i vjerovanja" [Walk through year, mythical background of Croatian folk beliefs and customs], Golden Marketing, Zagreb 1998.

Slavic gods
Life-death-rebirth gods
Agricultural gods
Fertility gods
Nature gods
Slovene mythology
Harvest gods
Love and lust deities
Love and lust gods
Spring deities
Ymir
Horse deities
Saint George (martyr)
Supernatural beings identified with Christian saints
Lunar gods